Luis Peña Martínez-Illescas (20 June 1918, in Santander – 29 March 1977, in Madrid) was a Spanish actor.

Peña came from a family of actors and performed in films and theater. His sister was the actress Pastora Peña. In 1946, he married Luchy Soto; the two formed a stage company. He worked on filmed plays for television which were shown on Televisión Española in the 1960s. At the end of his career, he acted for Carlos Saura.

Selected filmography
 Follow the Legion (1942)
 Ella, él y sus millones (1944)
 Bamboo (1945)
 The Holy Queen (1947)
 The Maragatan Sphinx (1950)
 Surcos (1951)
 Calle mayor (1956)
 Amanecer en puerta oscura (1957)
 Back to the Door (1959)
 The Red Rose (1960)
 Z7 Operation Rembrandt (1966)
 El jardín de las delicias (1970)
 A House Without Boundaries (1972)
 La prima Angélica (1974)

External links

 

1918 births
1977 deaths
People from Santander, Spain
Actors from Cantabria
Spanish male film actors
Spanish male television actors
20th-century Spanish male actors